Dragan Aničić (Serbian Cyrillic: Драган Аничић ; born 4 November 1970) is a Serbian football coach and former player.

Playing career 
Born in Belgrade, Aničić started youth career in FK Crvena Zvezda in 1979.

Coaching career 
After his playing career, Aničić began coaching. In 2003 he started coaching at BSK Borča youth academy and in 2006 became director of academy.

In 2013 he had first senior coaching spell with FK BSK Borča as a head coach in Serbian First League. After that he coached FK Sloga Petrovac na Mlavi, FK BSK Borča and finally in January 2017 he was appointed head coach of FK Mačva Šabac, leading the team to promotion from Serbian First League to Serbian SuperLiga after 65 years playing in lower divisions

On 15 October 2018, Aničić was appointed head coach of FK Voždovac.
In September 2019, Aničić returned to FK Mačva Šabac as manager and stayed till December 2020.

In January 2021, Aničić was appointed head coach of FK Železničar Pančevo

In September 2022, Aničić was appointed head coach of FK Rudar Pljevlja

References

External links 

1970 births
Living people
Yugoslav footballers
Serbian footballers
Serbian football managers
Serbian SuperLiga managers
FK Mačva Šabac managers
Association footballers not categorized by position